Tim Smith's Extra Special OceanLandWorld is the only solo album by Tim Smith of the English rock band Cardiacs, released in 1995 and recorded between 1989 and 1990. The song "Veronica in Ecstasy" also appeared on the Cardiacs compilation album Sampler (1995).

Track listing

Personnel 
Tim Smith - All instruments and vocals, except saxophones on "England's" which are by Sarah Smith

Notes

References 

1995 debut albums